Nowa Iwiczna railway station is a railway station at Nowa Iwiczna, Piaseczno, Masovian, Poland. It is served by Koleje Mazowieckie.

References
Station article at kolej.one.pl

Railway stations in Poland opened in 1957
Railway stations in Warsaw